Alessandro Quattrini (born 10 January 1974) is an Italian former professional footballer who played as a defender. After playing for the youth team of Milan, Quattrini spent one year at Gualdo in 1993, before moving to Crevalcore the following year. In 1996 he moved to Lodigiani, where he retired from football.

References

1974 births
Living people
Association football defenders
Italian footballers
A.S. Gualdo Casacastalda players
A.S. Lodigiani players
Serie C players